The Príncipe weaver (Ploceus princeps) is a species of bird in the family Ploceidae. It is endemic to São Tomé and Príncipe, where it is found on the island of Príncipe. It was described by Charles Lucien Bonaparte in 1851. Its natural habitat is subtropical or tropical moist lowland forests.

References

External links
 Principe Golden Weaver -  Species text in Weaver Watch.

Príncipe weaver
Endemic birds of São Tomé and Príncipe
Endemic fauna of Príncipe
Príncipe weaver
Príncipe weaver
Taxonomy articles created by Polbot